George Lawrence Senesky (April 4, 1922 – June 25, 2001) was an American professional basketball player and coach.  A 6'2" guard from Saint Joseph's University, he was the 1942-1943 College Basketball Season's Consensus Player of the Year and played for eight seasons in the Basketball Association of America (BAA) and the National Basketball Association (NBA), all with the Philadelphia Warriors.  He later coached the franchise, from 1955 through to 1958, winning the NBA title in 1956.

Professional career
A Pennsylvania native, Senesky played for the St. Joseph Hawks from 1940 to 1943. In his final year, he averaged 23.4 points a game scoring 515 total points in 22 games of that season, a school record. Seven years later, his brother Paul broke the record. He was the unofficial NCAA Division I scoring leader for that year. Afterwards, he served in the Army Air Forces in World War II. After he had served, he played for the Philadelphia Sphas of the American Basketball League for one season. He then went to play for the Philadelphia Warriors in the first season of the Basketball Association of America in 1947. That same year, the Warriors won the BAA Finals over the Chicago Stags. He scored 10.4 points per game in the 1950–51 season, with 679 points in 65 games. In his eight seasons, he played 482 games, made 1279 out of 4087 shots for a .313 percentage, and 897 out of 1277 free throws for a .702 percentage. He four seasons in which he averaged more than 8 points a game. After a season where he averaged 1.9 points a game with 111 points in 58 games, he retired.

Coaching career
Two seasons after retiring from the Warriors, Senesky returned to coach the team. Like the man he had replaced, Senesky won a title in his first year. In his first year, he coached them to a 45–27 record, finishing 1st in the Eastern Division. The Warriors beat the defending champion Syracuse Nationals in five games to advance to their first NBA Finals since 1948. In the Finals, the Warriors beat the Fort Wayne Pistons in five games to win their first championship in nine years.

In his second year, he led them to a 37–35 record, finishing three games behind the eventual champion Boston Celtics in the Division. The Warriors were swept in two games by the Syracuse Nationals.

In his third (and final) year, they finished with the same record and place in the division. They beat Syracuse in three games to advance to the Division Finals, but they lost to the Celtics in five games.

Death
Senesky died of cancer on June 25, 2001 at the age of 79.

BAA/NBA career statistics

Regular season

Playoffs

References

External links
 BasketballReference.com: George Senesky (as player)
 BasketballReference.com: George Senesky (as coach)

1922 births
2001 deaths
All-American college men's basketball players
American men's basketball coaches
American men's basketball players
Basketball coaches from Pennsylvania
Basketball players from Pennsylvania
Guards (basketball)
National Basketball Association championship-winning head coaches
People from Mahanoy City, Pennsylvania
Philadelphia Sphas players
Philadelphia Warriors head coaches
Philadelphia Warriors players
Saint Joseph's Hawks men's basketball players
20th-century American Jews